Rosalba formosa is a species of beetle in the family Cerambycidae. It was described by Martins and Galileo in 2008. It is known from Santa Cruz, in Bolivia.

References

Rosalba (beetle)
Beetles described in 2008